Alkaline phosphatase, placental-like 2 is a protein that in humans is encoded by the ALPPL2 gene.

Function 

There are at least four distinct but related alkaline phosphatases: intestinal, placental, placental-like, and liver/bone/kidney (tissue non-specific). The product of this gene is a membrane bound glycosylated enzyme, localized to testis, thymus and certain germ cell tumors, that is closely related to both the placental and intestinal forms of alkaline phosphatase.

References

External links

Further reading